This is a list of protests in the U.S. State of Wyoming related to the murder of George Floyd.

Locations

Casper 
On June 3, approximately 300 protesters marched peacefully through downtown Casper.

Cheyenne 
On Friday evening, May 29, about 125 protesters attended a candlelight vigil in Cheyenne near the steps of the State Capitol. Additional protests were held on May 30 and 31.

Cody 
On June 7, hundreds of protesters gathered in City Park, where they were surrounded by armed ex-police and military officers, but with no active police presence. The protesters held a moment of silence to honor George Floyd before marching peacefully around the park.

Gillette 
Approximately fifty people held a protest in Gillette on June 2.

Jackson 
Over 150 people protested peacefully at Town Square on May 31.

Laramie 
Over 100 protesters marched through Laramie on June 2. On June 4, hundreds of protestors walked the streets of downtown Laramie, with more events planned throughout the upcoming week.

Riverton 
About 100 protesters gathered at a park on June 1.

Rock Springs 
About 10 people protested peacefully on Dewar Drive on June 2.  One protester admitted he thought he would be pelted with eggs, but stated that people had been honking their horns or waving their hands to show support.  One protester, however, stated that there was some resistance and that they were followed after they were done protesting.  On the other side of the street, near the Rock Springs Chamber of Commerce, another protest began with protesters holding signs saying "All Lives Matter" and "Support Our Police."

Sheridan 
On June 5, about 500 people peacefully marched from the Sheridan County Fulmer Public Library to the Sheridan County Courthouse and back in support of Black Lives Matter. There was some animosity with some counter-protesters.

References 

Wyoming
2020 in Wyoming
Events in Wyoming
Riots and civil disorder in Wyoming
May 2020 events in the United States
June 2020 events in the United States